Hagar  is a biblical person in the Book of Genesis, handmaid of Sarah (the first wife of Abraham) and mother of Abraham's son Ishmael.

Hagar may also refer to:

 Hagar (name)
 Hagar, Ontario, a community in the Canadian province of Ontario
 Hagar Township, Michigan
 Hagar (company), an Icelandic retail company, part of the Baugur Group
 Ħaġar Qim, a megalithic temple complex found on the Mediterranean island of Malta, dating from 3600 to 3200 BC
 Hägar the Horrible, a comic strip by Dik Browne as well as the name of its main character
 Hagar in Islam
 682 Hagar, a presumed asteroid
 Hagar the Womb, an English punk rock band

See also
 Haggar (disambiguation)
 Hager, surname
 Hagger, surname
 Hajar (disambiguation)